Denis Murray may refer to:

 Denis Murray (journalist) (born 1951), retired British television journalist
 Denis Murray (athlete) (1881–1944), Irish athlete

See also
 Dennis Murray (disambiguation)